Ready to Deal is the third studio album by Australian singer Renée Geyer. The album was released in November 1975 and peaked at number 21, becoming Geyer's highest-charting album. The album is credited to Renée Geyer Band. The album features the track "Heading in the Right Direction" which became Geyer's first top 40 single in 1976.

"Sweet Love"  featured in the 2000 film Chopper starring Eric Bana.

In October 2010, Ready to Deal was listed in the book, 100 Best Australian Albums.

Track listing
Vinyl/ cassette (VPL1-0105)
Side one
"Sweet Love" (Renée Geyer, Mal Logan, Barry Sullivan, Mark Punch, Greg Tell) – 3.22
"If Loving You Is Wrong" (Homer Banks, Raymond Jackson, Carl Hampton) – 4.22
"Spilt Milk" (Logan, Geyer, Sullivan, Tell, Punch) – 5.02
"Whoop" (Logan, Geyer, Sullivan, Tell, Punch) – 6.53 
Side Two
"Heading in the Right Direction" (Garry Paige, Punch) – 4.04
"Two Sides" (Geyer, Logan, Sullivan, Punch, Tell) – 3.32
"Ready to Deal" (Geyer, Logan, Sullivan, Punch, Tell) – 3.32
"Love's Got a Hold" (Geyer, Logan, Punch, Sullivan, Tell) – 3.48
"I Really Love You (Geyer, Logan, Sullivan, Punch, Tell) – 5.55

Personnel
Renée Geyer Band members
Renée Geyer — vocals, backing vocals
Mal Logan – keyboards
Mark Punch – guitar
Barry "Big Goose" Sullivan – bass guitar
Greg Tell – drums

Additional musicians
Tony Buchanan – saxophone, flute
Russell Smith – trumpet

Charts

References

1975 albums
Renée Geyer albums
RCA Records albums
Mushroom Records albums
Jazz albums by Australian artists